Eleftheria Arvanitaki Live is an international compilation album by popular Greek artist Eleftheria Arvanitaki of live recordings that was released in 2003 under the EmArcy label through Verve Records. In addition to the songs on the previous album, it includes two previously unreleased songs recorded at Vox music club in March 2003.

Track listing
 "Omorfi Moy Agapi"
 "Sodade"
 "Dinata"
 "Ta Kormia Ke Ta Maheria"
 "Instrumental: Oud Improvisation/Tamzara/Traditional Thracian Dance"
 "Tha Spaso Koupes"
 "Parapono I Ksenitia"
 "Meno Ektos"
 "To Parapono"
 "Tha Klisso Ta Matia"
 "Stalia Stalia"
 "Thelo Konta Sou Na Mino"
 "Na Me Thimase"
 "Efiges Noris"
 "Pes Mou Mia Lexi"
 "Telos"
 "To Miden"

Eleftheria Arvanitaki live albums
Greek-language albums
2003 live albums
EmArcy Records live albums